Pike Creek is a  long 2nd order tributary to White Clay Creek in New Castle County, Delaware.

Course
Pike Creek rises on the White Clay Creek divide at Stirrup Farms, Delaware in New Castle County, Delaware.  Pike Creek then flows south-southeast to meet White Clay Creek at Choate, Delaware.

Watershed
Pike Creek drains  of area, receives about 46.2 in/year of precipitation, has a topographic wetness index of 398.22 and is about 24.6% forested.

See also
List of rivers of Delaware

References 

Rivers of Delaware
Rivers of New Castle County, Delaware
Tributaries of the Christina River
Wild and Scenic Rivers of the United States